Benjamin Lee "Ben" Peterson (born June 27, 1950) is a retired American freestyle wrestler. He competed at the 1972 and 1976 Olympics and won a gold and a silver medal, respectively. As a college wrestler, Peterson was a two-time NCAA champion at Iowa State. He founded the "Camp of Champs," which brought in Olympic wrestlers to train with high schoolers. Peterson also coached wrestling at Maranatha Baptist University for 28 years.

Early life

Peterson was born in Barron County, Wisconsin but grew up on a dairy farm in nearby Comstock. While attending Cumberland High School, Peterson competed in both football and wrestling. As a senior, he finished 2nd in the state wrestling tournament.

College career

Peterson continued his wrestling career at Iowa State University where he competed in the 190 pound weight class and studied architecture. Peterson continued his success capturing three Big Eight championships and back-to-back NCAA titles in 1971 and 1972.

Peterson would later be one of the first inductees into the Iowa State Hall of Fame in 1998.

International career and coaching

After his prep career came to an end, Peterson continued competing at the international level with great success.  At the 1972 Munich Olympics Peterson won gold in the 90 kg division. He followed that up with Bronze at the '73 World Championships in Tehran and Gold at the Mexico City hosted '75 Pan American Games. At the 1976 Montreal Olympics, Peterson would once again return to the podium with Silver in the 90 kg weight class. at the conclusion of the Montreal Olympic games, Peterson would retire from competitive wrestling to focus on coaching.

In 1972 Peterson began his coaching career as head coach at Maranatha Baptist University in Watertown, WI, a position he would hold for the next 28 years. In 1977 Ben along with his brother John would start the Camp of Champs Wrestling Camps. The camp is a faith-based wrestling skills camp.

Peterson was inducted into the National Wrestling Hall of Fame as a Distinguished Member in 2002.

Peterson Roll

Ben is often credited with having invented a version of the Granby Roll wrestling move, popularly called the Peterson Roll, but denies having invented the move.  He says that he used the move during the widely viewed Olympic Games, which is one reason the move became connected to him.

Olympic game matches

|-
!  Res.
!  Record
!  Opponent
!  Score
!  Date
!  Event
!  Location
|-
! style=background:white colspan=7 |
|-
|Loss
|11–1–1
|align=left| Levan Tediashvili
|style="font-size:88%"|5–11
|style="font-size:88%" rowspan=7|July 29, 1976
|style="font-size:88%" rowspan=7|1976 Olympic Games
|style="text-align:left;font-size:88%;" rowspan=7| Montreal
|-
|Win
|11–0–1
|align=left| Horst Stottmeister
|style="font-size:88%"|13–8
|-
|Win
|10–0–1
|align=left| Paweł Kurczewski
|style="font-size:88%"|13–4
|-
|Win
|9–0–1
|align=left| Bárbaro Morgan
|style="font-size:88%"|Fall
|-
|Win
|8–0–1
|align=left| Yoshiaki Yatsu
|style="font-size:88%"|19–2
|-
|Win
|7–0–1
|align=left| Shukri Akhmedov
|style="font-size:88%"|14–13
|-
|Win
|6–0–1
|align=left| Stelică Morcov
|style="font-size:88%"|7–4
|-
! style=background:white colspan=7 |
|-
|Win
|5–0–1
|align=left| Rusi Petrov
|style="font-size:88%"|Fall
|style="font-size:88%" rowspan=6|August 30, 1972
|style="font-size:88%" rowspan=6|1972 Olympic Games
|style="text-align:left;font-size:88%;" rowspan=6| Munich
|-
|Win
|4–0–1
|align=left| Bárbaro Morgan
|style="font-size:88%"|Fall
|-
|Win
|3–0–1
|align=left| Reza Khorrami
|style="font-size:88%"|Won
|-
|Draw
|2–0–1
|align=left| Gennady Strakhov
|style="font-size:88%"|Draw
|-
|Win
|2–0
|align=left| Raúl García
|style="font-size:88%"|Fall
|-
|Win
|1–0
|align=left| Paweł Kurczewski
|style="font-size:88%"|Won
|-
| colspan="7"  style="font-size:8pt; text-align:center;"|Reference:

References

1950 births
Iowa State Cyclones wrestlers
Olympic silver medalists for the United States in wrestling
Wrestlers at the 1972 Summer Olympics
Wrestlers at the 1976 Summer Olympics
American male sport wrestlers
People from Barron County, Wisconsin
Sportspeople from Wisconsin
Iowa State University alumni
Maranatha Baptist University alumni
Living people
Pew Fellows in the Arts
World Wrestling Championships medalists
Medalists at the 1976 Summer Olympics
Medalists at the 1972 Summer Olympics
Olympic gold medalists for the United States in wrestling
Pan American Games medalists in wrestling
Pan American Games gold medalists for the United States
Wrestlers at the 1975 Pan American Games
Medalists at the 1975 Pan American Games